The Academic Library Advancement and Development Network (ALADN) is a community of practice supporting professionals involved in library development and advancement. The group "is designed to offer networking and mutual problem-solving for professionals involved in advancement and development for academic and research libraries through annual conference, electronic listserv participation (LIBDEV sponsored by ALADN), and personal contacts". Three standing committees and a rotating conference planning group compose ALADN's structure. 

ALADN's beginning was rooted in a conference hosted by the University of New Mexico Libraries held March 15-17, 1995, titled "More than Books: Building a Network of Academic and Research Library Development Officers".  

ALADN's LIBDEV listserv and its archives are hosted by the University of Florida.

Conferences

References

External links
Call for Proposals, ALADN 2017
ALADN Homepage

Library associations in the United States
Canadian library associations